Leonardo López may refer to:

Leonardo Daniel (born 1954), born Leonardo Daniel López de Rodas García, Mexican actor and director
Leonardo López Luján (born 1964), Mexican archaeologist
Leo López (footballer) (born 1970), born Leonardo López Jiménez, Spanish football manager and former footballer
MkLeo (born 2001), born Leonardo López Pérez, Mexican professional esports player

See also
Leo López (disambiguation)
Leobardo López Aretche (1942-1970), Mexican film director
Leobardo López (born 1983), Mexican footballer
Leonardo Lopes (born 1998), Portuguese footballer